Patricia Kim Alletson (born June 30, 1958 in Brockville, Ontario) is a Canadian former competitive figure skater. She is the 1977 Skate Canada International champion, the 1973 Grand Prix International St. Gervais bronze medallist, and a two-time (1975, 1976) Canadian national silver medallist. She represented Canada at the 1976 Winter Olympics, where she placed 14th.

Competitive highlights

References

 
 
 

1958 births
Living people
Canadian female single skaters
Figure skaters at the 1976 Winter Olympics
Olympic figure skaters of Canada
Sportspeople from Brockville